Afolabi Olabimtan (11 June 1932 – 27 August 2003) was a Nigerian politician, writer, and academic. He was born in Ogun State and was later the senator for Ogun West from 1999 to 2003. He died in a motor accident in August 2003.

Olabimtan achieved a PhD at the University of Lagos in African Languages.  He became an expert in the Yoruba language, and wrote a number of novels in the tongue, such as Kekere Ekun in 1967 and Ayanmo in 1973.

In 1999, Olabimatan was elected as a senator for the Alliance for Democracy party for Ogun West. He served just one term, standing down in 2003 in order to allow a younger successor to take his place. Later in the same year he was killed in a motor accident.

References

1932 births
2003 deaths
People from Ogun State
Road incident deaths in Nigeria
Members of the Senate (Nigeria)
Yoruba writers
University of Lagos alumni
Alliance for Democracy (Nigeria) politicians
Yoruba politicians
Yoruba-language writers
20th-century Nigerian politicians
21st-century Nigerian politicians